GE Equipment Services was a Stamford, Connecticut-based division of General Electric Industrial, providing transport solutions for supply chains, including equipment leasing, asset management, and logistics services.

The European headquarters of GE Equipment Services was located in Amsterdam, Netherlands.

Divisions of GE Equipment Services included:
 GE Rail Services Europe
 Penske Truck Leasing
 General Electric Railcar Services Corp.

The European division of GE Equipment Services was sold in October 2013 to HNA Group, China  and keeps its operation as TIP Trailer Services.

References

External links
 GE Equipment Services

General Electric Industrial subsidiaries
Logistics companies of the United States
Transportation companies based in Connecticut